Scopula deflavaria is a moth of the  family Geometridae. It is found in Indonesia (Tenimber, Bali, Java, Sumatra, Timor and Sulawesi).

Subspecies
Scopula deflavaria deflavaria (Tanimbar Islands)
Scopula deflavaria calorifica (Warren, 1898) (Bali)
Scopula deflavaria relevata Prout, 1938 (Sulawesi)

References

Moths described in 1896
deflavaria
Moths of Indonesia